The 2017–18 season is the club's third season in the Scottish Championship. St Mirren will also compete in the Challenge Cup, the League Cup and the Scottish Cup.

Month by month review

May
9 May – defender Adam Eckersley signed a two-year contract extension with the club, tying him to the club until the summer of 2019. It was also confirmed that Ben Gordon, Andy Webster and Jordan Stewart would leave the club when their contracts expire in the summer.

11 May – young defender Jack Baird signed a one-year contract extension with the club.

15 May – veteran goalkeeper Jamie Langfield signed a one-year contract extension with the club. It is anticipated that Langfield will fulfil a coaching role, rather than be involved in a playing capacity.

18 May – highly rated midfielder Stevie Mallan signed a two-year contract with EFL Championship side Barnsley for an undisclosed fee.

19 May – midfielder Josh Todd signed a one-year contract extension with the club after signing in January.

22 May – defender Gary MacKenzie became the fifth player to sign a contract extension this summer, signing up for another season with the club. Also on this day, forward Cammy Smith left Aberdeen and joined Saints on a two-year deal, after a successful loan spell last season.

23 May – midfielder Kyle Hutton was released by the club, when his contract was terminated by mutual agreement.

24 May – young midfielder Kyle Magennis signed a new deal with the club, committing him to the summer of 2020.

Also on this day, Saints signed goalkeeper Ross M. Stewart from Albion Rovers and midfielder Jordan Kirkpatrick from Alloa Athletic. Both players have penned two-year deals with the club.

26 May – Jack Ross recruited two more players when forward Ross C. Stewart signed a two-year contract from Albion Rovers, and defender Gregor Buchanan signed from Dumbarton one a one-year deal.

June
2 June – Saints were paired along with Partick Thistle, Airdrieonians, Stranraer and Livingston in the League Cup draw. Fixtures will commence from 15–19 July.

7 June – goalkeeper Craig Samson rejoined Saints on a two-year deal after leaving Motherwell, tying him to the club until June 2019.

12 June – after impressing in his short time at the club, defender Stelios Demetriou signed a one-year contract extension in June 2017.

13 June – striker Gavin Reilly signed a one-year deal after leaving Heart of Midlothian.

15 June – defender Gary Irvine signed a one-year contract extension.

16 June – young midfielder Nathan Flanagan signed a one-year contract with the club, after graduating from the youth setup.

27 June – striker Dale Hilson signed a six-month deal with the club, after leaving Queen of the South.

29 June – youngster Lewis McLear left the club by mutual agreement. The midfielder had been at the club for three years, but failed to breakthrough to the first team.

July
13 July – midfielder Ian McShane signed a two-year deal with Saints, after leaving Ross County.

August
1 August – defender Harry Davis joined the club, after being released by Crewe Alexandra. Davis was on loan at Saints last year, and joins on a one-year deal with the option of a further year.

3 August – Rocco Quinn left the club by mutual agreement, after just one year of his two-year deal.

4 August – Jack Ross and assistant, James Fowler, signed contract extensions with the club – ensuring they remain with the club until at least 2020.

10 August – striker Darryl Duffy signed a one-year deal with Saints, having recently played in India.

14 August – Saints signed defender Liam Smith on a one-year loan from Hearts.

September
22 September – Saints signed Celtic defender Jamie McCart on an emergency loan, following injuries and suspensions. McCart signed until 23 December 2017.

December
12 December – striker Danny Mullen signed on an emergency loan from fellow Scottish Championship challengers, Livingston. It was reported than Mullen will sign on a permanent contract in January 2018, when his loan period expires.

21 December – forward Ross C. Stewart moved on loan to Scottish League One side Alloa Athletic, until the end of the season.

28 December – defender Jamie McCart ended his loan period, and returned to Celtic.

31 December – forward Dale Hilson was released after his short-term contract expired. He made five appearances for the club, scoring one goal.

January
5 January – Lewis Morgan signed a -year contract with Celtic and was immediately loaned back to Saints until the end of the season. The fee was undisclosed, but is thought to have been around £300,000.

10 January – striker Darryl Duffy signed on loan for Scottish League One side Airdrieonians until the end of the season.

11 January – defender Gregor Buchanan left the club by mutual consent. He made 16 appearances, and scored two goal since joining at the start of the season. He signed for Livingston later in the day.

Also on this day, it was confirmed that Danny Mullen had signed a -year permanent deal with Saints, tying him to the club until the summer of 2020.

12 January – manager Jack Ross received the Scottish Championship December Manager of the Month award.

15 January – Saints added to the squad when experienced midfielder Ryan Flynn signed, after being recently released by Oldham Athletic. The 29-year-old joins on a two-and-a-half-year deal.

16 January – 19-year-old midfielder Mark Hill signed on loan from Celtic until the end of the season.

19 January – midfielder Jordan Kirkpatrick returned to Alloa Athletic on loan until the end of the season.

31 January – winger Myles Hippolyte signed on an 18-month contract after being released by Falkirk.

Also on this day, youngster Cameron MacPherson signed on loan for Stranraer until the end of the season.

February
1 February – defender Jack Baird signed a one-year extension to his current contract, keeping his at Saints until the summer of 2019.

6 February – manager Jack Ross received the Scottish Championship January Manager of the Month award, his second such award in a row. Saints captain Stephen McGinn also won the Player of the Month award.

20 February – veteran Italian midfielder Massimo Donati signed a short-term contract until the end of the season. Donati left Premiership side Hamilton Academical last month.

March
20 March – Josh Todd signed for Queen of the South on an emergency loan deal until the end of the season.

April
5 April – Jack Ross received the Scottish Championship March Manager of the Month award, making it a hat-trick of awards for the season.

14 April – Saints won the Scottish Championship after a goalless draw at home to Livingston. It ended the club's three-year exile from the Scottish Premiership, after being relegated in 2015.

20 April – club captain, Stephen McGinn, penned a new two-year contract with the club after leading Saints to the Scottish Premiership.

29 April – Jack Ross was named PFA Manager of the Year, and Lewis Morgan was named Scottish Championship Player of the Year.

Squad list

Results & fixtures

Pre season / Friendlies

Scottish Championship

Scottish Challenge Cup

Scottish League Cup

Scottish Cup

Player statistics

Appearances and goals

|-
|colspan="14"|Players who left the club during the season:
|-

|-
|}

Disciplinary record
Includes all competitive matches.
Last updated 30 April 2018

Team statistics

League table

Division summary

Management statistics
Last updated on 30 April 2018

Transfers

Players in

Players out

See also
List of St Mirren F.C. seasons

Notes

References

St Mirren F.C. seasons
St Mirren